The Theatre Royal was a patent theatre located in Cork City, Ireland.

History

The Theatre Royal was founded by local actor Spranger Barry in 1760. It was modelled on the Crow Street Theatre, Dublin. In 1766 when he left for London, Barry controversially left his son Thomas Barry as manager of the theatre, but his tenure lasted for less than a year.

The theatre was destroyed by fire on April Fool's Day 1840. In 1853 it was rebuilt, and in the 1860s it was refurbished under the direction of Sir John Benson, and re-opened on 26 December 1867.

In 1875 the theatre was sold to the postal service and Cork's GPO opened on the site in 1877. The last three plays performed were James Sheridan Knowles' Virginius; William Shakespeare's Hamlet; and John Wilson's Belphegor.

Description
An 1867 description from the Illustrated London News:

References

Theatres in Cork (city)
Theatres completed in 1760
1760 establishments in Ireland
Organisations based in Cork (city)